Tenmile is an unincorporated community in Douglas County, Oregon, United States. It is located on Oregon Route 42 southwest of Roseburg.

Although Tenmile is unincorporated, it has a post office by the same name. The ZIP code is 97481.

History
Tenmile Post Office was so-named because a pioneer drove his cattle from Happy Valley in Douglas County to an area now known as Tenmile Valley. The distance between the two places was about 10 miles. The post office was established in 1870 as "Ten Mile" and changed to "Tenmile" in 1918.

References

External links
Images of Tenmile Post Office from waymarking.com

Unincorporated communities in Douglas County, Oregon
1870 establishments in Oregon
Populated places established in 1870
Unincorporated communities in Oregon